Barbara Pócza (born 6 April 1986) is a Hungarian former professional tennis player.

Biography
A right-handed player from Győr, Pócza was ranked as high as 63 in the world as a junior.

Pócza won two professional titles on the ITF circuit, at Carcavelos in 2003 and Dubrovnik in 2004. 

In 2005 she featured in two Federation Cup ties for Hungary. She played a doubles rubber against Estonia, which she and partner Ágnes Szávay won, then appeared against Luxembourg in a singles match, losing to Mandy Minella.

Pócza finished up on the professional tour in 2005 and later played college tennis in the United States for Barry University. She helped Barry University claim the NCAA Women's Division II Tennis Championship title as a senior in 2011.

ITF finals

Singles (2–2)

Doubles (2–4)

See also
List of Hungary Fed Cup team representatives

References

External links
 
 
 

1986 births
Living people
Hungarian female tennis players
Sportspeople from Győr
Barry Buccaneers women's tennis players
21st-century Hungarian women